Sprat is the common name applied to a group of forage fish belonging to the genus Sprattus in the family Clupeidae. The term also is applied to a number of other small sprat-like forage fish (Clupeoides, Clupeonella, Corica, Ehirava, Hyperlophus, Microthrissa, Nannothrissa, Platanichthys, Ramnogaster, Rhinosardinia, and Stolothrissa). Like most forage fishes, sprats are highly active, small, oily fish. They travel in large schools with other fish and swim continuously throughout the day.

They are recognized for their nutritional value, as they contain high levels of polyunsaturated fats, considered beneficial to the human diet. They are eaten in many places around the world. Sprats are sometimes passed off as other fish; products sold as having been prepared from anchovies (since the 19th century) and others sold as sardines sometimes are prepared from sprats, as the authentic ones once were less accessible. They are known for their smooth flavour and are easy to mistake for baby sardines.

Species

True sprats
True sprats belong to the genus Sprattus in the family Clupeidae. The five species are:

* Type species

Other sprats
The term also is commonly applied to a number of other small sprat-like forage fish that share characteristics of the true sprat. Apart from the true sprats, FishBase lists another 48 species whose common names ends with "sprat". Some examples are:

Characteristics

The average length of time from fertilization to hatching is about 15 days, with environmental factors playing a major role in the size and overall success of the sprat. The development of young larval sprat and reproductive success of the sprat have been largely influenced by environmental factors. Some of these factors affecting the sprat can be seen in the Baltic Sea, where specific gravity, water temperature, depth, and other such factors play a role in their success.

Over the last two decades, the number of sprat has fluctuated, due primarily to availability of zooplankton, a common food source, and also from overall changes in Clupeidae total abundance. Although the overall survival rates of the sprat decreased in the late 1980s and early 1990s, an increase has occurred in the last two decades. Recent studies suggesting a progression in the reproductive success of the sprat acknowledge that a significant increase in spawning stock biomass occurred. One of the main concerns for reproductive success for the sprat include exceedingly cold winters, as cold temperatures, especially in the Baltic Sea, have been known to affect the development of sprat eggs and larvae.

The metabolic rate of the sprat is highly influenced by environmental factors such as water temperature. Several related fish, such as the Atlantic herring (C. harengus), have much lower metabolic rates than that of the sprat. Some of the difference may be due to size differences among the related species, but the most important reason for high levels of metabolism for the sprat is their exceedingly high level of activity throughout the day.

Distribution
Fish of the different species of sprat are found in various parts of the world including New Zealand, Australia, and parts of Europe. By far, the most highly studied location where sprat, most commonly Sprattus sprattus, reside is the Baltic Sea in Northern Europe. The Baltic Sea provides the sprat with a highly diverse environment, with spatial and temporal potential allowing for successful reproduction.

One of the most well-known locations in the Baltic Sea where they forage for their food is the Bornholm Basin, in the southern portion of the Baltic Sea. Although the Baltic Sea has undergone several ecological changes during the last two decades, the sprat has dramatically increased in population. One of the environmental changes that has occurred in the Baltic Sea since the 1980s includes a decrease in water salinity, due to a lack of inflow from the North Sea that contains high saline and oxygen content.

Ecology

In the Baltic Sea, cod, herring, and sprat are considered the most important species. Cod is the top predator, while the herring and sprat primarily are recognized as prey. This has been proven by many studies that analyze the stomach contents of such fish, often finding contents that immediately signify predation among the species. Although cod primarily feed on adult sprat, sprat tend to feed on cod before the cod have been fully developed. The sprat tends to prey on the cod eggs and larvae. Furthermore, sprat and herring are considered highly competitive for the same resources that are available to them. This is most present in the vertical migration of the two species in the Baltic Sea, where they compete for the limited zooplankton that is available and necessary for their survival.

Sprats are highly selective in their diet and are strict zooplanktivores that do not change their diet as their size increases, like some herring, but include only zooplankton in their diet. They eat various species of zooplankton in accordance to changes in the environment, as temperature and other such factors affect the availability of their food.

During autumn, sprats tend to have a diet high in Temora longicornis and Bosmina maritime. During the winter, their diet includes Pesudocalanus elongates. Pseudocalanus is genus of the order Calanoida and subclass Copepoda that is important to the predation and diet of fish in the Baltic Sea.

In both autumn and winter, a tendency exists for sprats to avoid eating Acartia spp., because they tend to be very small in size and have a high escape response to predators such as the herring and sprat. Although Acartia spp. may be present in large numbers, they also tend to dwell more toward the surface of the water, whereas the sprats, especially during the day, tend to dwell in deeper waters.

Fisheries

As food
In Northern Europe, European sprats are commonly smoked and preserved in oil, which retains a strong, smoky flavor.

Sprat, if smoked, is considered to be one of the foods highest in purine content. People who suffer from gout or high uric acid in the blood should avoid eating such foods.

Most importantly, sprats contain long-chain polyunsaturated fatty acids, including eicosapentaenoic acid (EPA) and docosahexaenoic acid (DHA). They are present in amounts comparable to Atlantic salmon, and up to seven times higher in EPA and DHA than common fresh fillets of gilt-head bream. The sprats contain about 1.43 g/100 g of these polyunsaturated fatty acids that have been found to help prevent mental, neural, and cardiovascular diseases.

References

Further reading
 
 Tony Ayling & Geoffrey Cox, Collins Guide to the Sea Fishes of New Zealand, (William Collins Publishers Ltd, Auckland, New Zealand 1982) 

Sprattus
Commercial fish
Clupeidae
Fish common names